Joshua Brynmor Rusby Holling (born 15 February 1996) is an English former first-class cricketer.

Holling was born at Barnsley in February 1996. He was educated at Silcoates School, before going up to Leeds Beckett University. While studying at Leeds, he played two first-class cricket matches for Leeds/Bradford MCCU against Derbyshire and Yorkshire in 2019. He scored 16 runs in his two matches, while with his left-arm medium pace bowling, he took 4 wickets with best figures of 3 for 56.

References

External links

1996 births
Living people
Cricketers from Barnsley
People educated at Silcoates School
Alumni of the University of Leeds
English cricketers
Leeds/Bradford MCCU cricketers